This is a list of settlements in the Kozani regional unit, Greece.

 Achladia
 Agia Kyriaki
 Agia Paraskevi
 Agia Sotira
 Agiasma
 Agioi Anargyroi
 Agioi Theodoroi
 Agios Charalampos
 Agios Christoforos
 Agios Dimitrios
 Agios Theodoros
 Aiani
 Aidonochori
 Akrini
 Aliakmonas
 Alonakia
 Amygdalea
 Anarrachi
 Anatoliko, Eordaia
 Anatoliko, Kozani
 Ano Komi
 Anthochori
 Anthotopos
 Anthousa
 Apidia
 Ardassa
 Argilos
 Asproula
 Asvestopetra
 Avgerinos
 Avgi
 Avles
 Axiokastro
 Charavgi
 Cheimerino
 Chorigos
 Chromio
 Chrysavgi
 Dafnero
 Dafni
 Damaskinia
 Dicheimarro
 Dilofo
 Dragasia
 Drepano
 Drosero
 Dryovouno
 Elati
 Emporio
 Eratyra
 Ermakia
 Exochi
 Foufas
 Galateia
 Galatini
 Goules
 Imera
 Kaisareia
 Kalamia
 Kaloneri
 Kapnochori
 Kardia
 Karyditsa
 Karyochori
 Kastania
 Katafygio
 Kato Komi
 Kerasea
 Kipos
 Kleisoreia
 Kleitos
 Koila
 Koilada
 Koiladi
 Komanos
 Komnina
 Kontovouni
 Koryfi
 Kozani
 Kranidia
 Kremasti
 Krimini
 Krokos
 Kteni
 Lefkadia
 Lefkara
 Lefkopigi
 Lefkothea
 Lefkovrysi
 Leventis
 Liknades
 Livadero 
 Livera
 Loukomi
 Louvri
 Lygeri
 Mavrodendri
 Mavropigi
 Mesiani
 Mesolongos
 Mesovouno
 Metamorfosi
 Metaxas
 Mikrokastro
 Mikrovalto
 Milea
 Milochori 
 Molocha
 Morfi
 Namata
 Nea Nikopoli
 Neapoli
 Neraida
 Oinoi
 Olympiada
 Omali
 Palaiokastro
 Panareti
 Pelekanos
 Pentalofos
 Pentavrysos
 Peponia
 Perdikkas
 Peristera
 Petrana
 Plakida
 Platania
 Platanorrevma
 Polyfyto
 Polykastano
 Polylakko
 Polymylos
 Polyrracho
 Pontokomi
 Proastio
 Profitis Ilias
 Protochori
 Ptelea
 Pteleonas
 Ptolemaida
 Pylorio
 Pyrgoi
 Pyrgos
 Rodiani
 Roditis
 Rodochori
 Ryaki
 Rymnio
 Servia
 Siatista
 Sideras
 Simantro
 Sisani
 Skalochori
 Skiti
 Sparto
 Spilia
 Stavrodromi
 Sterna
 Tetralofo
 Thymaria
 Tranovalto
 Trapezitsa
 Trigoniko
 Tsotyli
 Vatero
 Vathylakkos
 Velanidia
 Velventos
 Vlasti
 Voskochori
 Vouchorina
 Vronti
 Vythos 
 Xirolimni
 Zoni
 Zoodochos Pigi

By municipality

See also

List of towns and villages in Greece

 
Kozani